Ductina is a genus of extinct, small to average sized, eyeless phacopid trilobite, that lived during the Devonian.

Description 

The body of Ductina is small to average (up to ), 1¼ to 2 times as long as wide, blunted oval. Body without any adornment. The headshield (or cephalon) is 2 to 3 times as wide as it is long in the direction of the axis (or sagittally). The cephalic axis (or glabella) is strongly widening forward with shallow furrows, the front curving downward to end at an approximate straight angle to the plain of the axis. Another shallow furrow (the occipital furrow), with left and right a deep pit (apodemal pit), crosses to the back of the glabella to define a narrow band (or occipital ring), and just in front left and right a small lobe is defined by shallow furrows and a deep pits. The back of the cephalon is often broken, obscuring the features of the occipital ring. Eyes and eye ridges (palpebral lobes) are absent. The natural fracture lines (sutures) of the cephalon coincide with its margin (unique with the Phacopidae), so there are no free cheeks (or librigenae). The genal angles are rounded, not truncated, no genal spine. The thorax has 10 segments, and the width of the axis is about ⅓ of the thorax. Tailpiece (or pygidium) is 20 to 35% of the length of the body. The pygidial axis (or rachis) is pointed (or acute), ending at the border.

Distribution 

The species of the genus Ductina lived during the Devonian in Europe and South-East Asia.

Fossils of D. vietnamica have been found in the Eifelian of China (Nandan Formation, Luofu, Nandan County, Guangxi Province , and Hunan Province); and in the Pragian of Vietnam (Song Hiem, Mia Le Beds ).

Fossils of D. ductifrons have been found in the Famennian of the United Kingdom, Germany (Eskesberg, Nehden, Varresbeck, all near Wupperthal), Poland (near Psiarnia, in the Southern part of the Holy Cross Mountains ), and the Western Urals in Russia.

Habitat 
All phacopids were probably marine bottom-dwellers. D. vietnamica has been found with several open water species (Nandan Formation in Guanxi, China), indicating deep and dark waters, probably poor in oxygen near the bottom where Ductina lived. It has also been found as part of a species rich community characteristic of a shallow coral sea.

Key to the species

References 

Phacopidae
Devonian trilobites of Europe
Fossils of China
Fossils of Germany
Fossils of Poland
Fossils of Russia
Fossils of Sweden
Fossils of Great Britain
Fossils of Vietnam
Early Devonian first appearances
Famennian extinctions
Devonian trilobites of Asia